United Nations Security Council resolution 1176, adopted unanimously on 24 June 1998, after reaffirming Resolution 696 (1991) and all subsequent resolutions on Angola, particularly Resolution 1173 (1998), the Council suspended its intention to impose further sanctions against UNITA for non-compliance until 1 July 1998.

Acting under Chapter VII of the United Nations Charter, the security council demanded UNITA comply unconditionally with its obligations and decided that the restrictions would come into force at 00:01 EST on 1 July 1998, unless the council and secretary-general decided otherwise. The committee established in Resolution 864 (1993) was to report by 7 August 1998 on how countries had implemented the measures specified in Resolution 1173. In a similar manner, countries were asked to report on the measures they had taken to enforce the sanctions by 22 July 1998.

See also
 Angolan Civil War
 Blood diamond
 De Beers
 Kimberley Process Certification Scheme
 List of United Nations Security Council Resolutions 1101 to 1200 (1997–1998)
 United Nations Security Council Resolution 1295

References

External links
 
Text of the Resolution at undocs.org

 1176
1998 in Angola
 1176
United Nations Security Council sanctions regimes
Blood diamonds
June 1998 events